Kiran (Devanagari: किरण) is an Indian given name. It originates in the Sanskrit word ,  meaning "ray" or "ray of light" or "beam of light". Other names that sound like Kiran are Kira, Kirwan, Ciaran, Keiran and Kieran. Notable people with the name include:

 Kiran Abbavaram  (born 1992), Indian actor
 Kiran Ahluwalia (born 1965), Indian-Canadian singer
 Kiran Bechan (born 1982), Dutch footballer
 Kiran Bedi (born 1949), Indian social activist
 Kiran Chemjong (born 1990), Nepali footballer
 Kiran Chetry (born 1974), American television journalist
 Kiran Desai (born 1971), Indian author
 Kiran George (born 2000), Indian badminton player
 Kiran Gurung, Nepalese politician
 Kiran Juneja (born 1964), Indian actress
 Kiran Kedlaya (born 1974), Indian-American mathematician
 Kiran Khan (swimmer) (born 1990), Pakistani swimmer
 Kiran Kher (born 1955), Indian actress
 Kiran Kumar (born 1953), Indian actor
 Kiran Kumar Reddy (born 1960), Indian politician, Chief Minister of Andhra Pradesh
 Kiran Martin (born 1959), Indian social worker
 Kiran Mazumdar-Shaw (born 1953), Indian entrepreneur
 Kiran More (born 1962), Indian cricketer
 Kiran Nagarkar (1942–2019), Indian writer and critic
 Kiran Powar (born 1976), Indian cricketer
 Kiran Rao (born 1973), Indian film producer
 Kiran Rathod (born 1981), Indian actress
 Kiran Sethi (born 1967), Indian police officer
 Kiran Shah (born 1956), Kenyan actor
 Usha Kiran Khan (born 1945), Indian historian

Fictional characters 
 Kiran, the default player name in the video game Fire Emblem Heroes
 Kiran, the title character in the Pakistani television serial Kiran, portrayed by Marjan Fatima

See also
Ciarán, an Irish male given name, sometimes spelt Kiran
Kiran (disambiguation)

References 

Indian unisex given names